Michal Burian (born 27 June 1992) is a Czech-born Australian Paralympic javelin thrower. At the 2020 Summer Paralympics, he won a silver medal.

Personal 
Burian was born with club foot and grew up in the Czech Republic. He arrived in Australia in 2012, on a six-month visa and speaking little English. He soon decided to settle in Australia permanently, and has since become an Australian citizen. He has completed a Diploma in Sport and Recreation Management. , he lives in Melbourne and works as a project coordinator.

Athletics 

As a teen in the Czech Republic, Burian watched Olympic javelin champion and world record holder Jan Železný throwing at his local club. By the age of 18, he was a member of the (able-bodied) Czech junior national team.  He was then told he should not continue in sport due to his impairment. 

Following his arrival in Australia, Burian joined Sandringham Athletics Club. He was classified as an F44 para-athlete in 2020. , Burian holds the Australian record for Men’s javelin F44, with a distance of 61.24m.

At the 2020 Tokyo Paralympics, he won the silver medal in the Men's Javelin F64 with a personal best throw of 66.20m and holds the new world record in the F44 category.

References

External links

Paralympic athletes of Australia
Australian male javelin throwers
Living people
1992 births
Australian people of Czech descent
Athletes (track and field) at the 2020 Summer Paralympics
Medalists at the 2020 Summer Paralympics
Paralympic silver medalists for Australia
Paralympic medalists in athletics (track and field)